Matrixxman, otherwise known as Charles M. Duff, is an American electronic musician and DJ, born on June 14th

Discography 
 Homesick Remixes, 2016
 Homesick, 2015
 StuxNet 2015
 State of Mind, 2014
 Nubian Metropolis, 2014
 The Spell EP, 2014
 Amulet, 2014
 The XX Files, Part II, 2014
 The XX Files, 2013

References

American electronic musicians
Living people
Year of birth missing (living people)